Sene is a nearly extinct Papuan language spoken in Morobe Province, Papua New Guinea.

References

Languages of Morobe Province
Huon languages
Critically endangered languages
Endangered languages of Oceania